Trnovica ( or ) is a small settlement in the Municipality of Ivančna Gorica in central Slovenia. It lies in the hills southeast of Ivančna Gorica in the historical region of Lower Carniola. The municipality is now included in the Central Slovenia Statistical Region.

References

External links
Trnovica on Geopedia

Populated places in the Municipality of Ivančna Gorica